Bourland is a surname. Notable people with the surname include:

Cliff Bourland (1921-2018), American sprinter in the 1948 Summer Olympics
James G. Bourland (1801-1979), American politician
Roger Bourland (born 1952), American music composer and professor at UCLA
William H. Bourland (1811–1860), American politician